Dinara Safina defeated Svetlana Kuznetsova in the final, 6–3, 6–2 to win the women's singles tennis title at the 2009 Italian Open.

Jelena Janković was the two-time defending champion, but lost in the quarterfinals to Kuznetsova.

Seeds
The top eight seeds receive a bye into the second round.

Draw

Finals

Top half

Section 1

Section 2

Bottom half

Section 3

Section 4

External links
Main draw
Qualifying draw

Italian Open - Singles
Women's Singles